A ballpark, or baseball park, is a type of sports venue where baseball is played. The playing field is divided into the infield, an area whose dimensions are rigidly defined, and the outfield, where dimensions can vary widely from place to place. A larger ballpark may also be called a baseball stadium because it shares characteristics with other outdoor stadiums.

General characteristics

The playing field

A baseball field can be referred to as a diamond. The infield is a rigidly structured diamond of dirt and grass containing the three bases, home plate, and the pitcher's mound. The space between the bases and home is normally a grass surface, save for the dirt mound in the center. Some ballparks have grass or artificial turf between the bases, and dirt only around the bases and pitcher's mound. Others, such as Koshien Stadium in Hyōgo Prefecture, Japan, have an infield of entirely dirt.

Two white lines extend from the home plate area, aligned with the first and third bases. These are the foul lines or base lines, usually differentiated by referring to them as the first base line, or the third base line. If a ball hit by the batter lands outside of the space between these two lines or rolls out of this space before reaching first or third base, the ball is "foul" (meaning it is dead and the play is over). If it lands between or on the lines, it is "fair". At the end of the lines are two foul poles, which help the umpires judge whether a ball is fair or foul. These "foul poles" are actually in fair territory, so a ball that hits them on the fly is a home run (if hit on the bounce, it is instead an automatic double).

On either side of home plate are the two batter's boxes (left-handed and right-handed.) This is where the batter stands when at bat. Behind home is the catcher's box, where the catcher and the home plate umpire stand.

Next to the first and third base are two coaches' boxes, where the first and third base coaches guide the baserunners, generally with gestures or shouts. As the baserunner faces away from the outfield when running from second base to third, they cannot see where the ball is and must look to the third base coach on whether to run, stop, or slide.

Farther from the infield on either side are the dugouts, where the teams and coaches sit when they're not on the field. They are named such because, at the professional levels, this seating is below the level of the playing field so as to not block the view from prime spectator seating locations. In amateur parks, the dugouts may be above-ground wooden or CMU structures with seating inside, or simply benches behind a chain-link fence.

Beyond the infield and between the foul lines is a large grass outfield, generally twice the depth of the infield. The playing field is bordered by fences of varying heights. The infield fences are in foul territory, and a ball hit over them is not a home run; consequently, they are often lower than the outfield fences to provide a better view for spectators. Sometimes, the outfield fence is made higher in certain areas to compensate for close proximity to the batter.

In the 1937 refurbishment of the original Yankee Stadium, a running track that ran the perimeter of the field was incorporated into the field of play as the first warning track. MLB formalized the warning track as a requirement in 1949.

Beyond the outfield fence in professional parks is an area called the batter's eye. To ensure the batter can see the white ball, the batter's eye contains no seating and is darker in color. The batter's eye area can be anything from a dark wall to a grassy slope.

Most major baseball parks are oriented with the central axis (home plate through second base through center field) of the playing field running toward the north or east or some direction between. Major League Baseball Rule 1.04 states that it is "desirable" (but not required) that the central axis run east-northeast (about 22 degrees north of east). This is to prevent the setting sun from being in the batter's eyes. In practice, major league parks vary up to about 90 degrees from east-northeast in either direction, but none face west, except for a few which are oriented just slightly west of straight north.

Seating
Today, in Major League Baseball, a multi-tiered seating area, a grandstand, surrounds the infield. How far this seating extends down the baselines or around the foul poles varies from park to park. In minor league parks, the grandstands are notably smaller, proportional to expected sizes of crowds compared with the major leagues.

The seating beyond the outfield fence generally differs from the grandstand, though some multi-purpose or jewel box parks have the grandstand surround the entire field. This area could contain inexpensive bleacher seats, smaller grandstands, or simply inclined seating. In local ballparks, there are often simply a set or two of aluminum bleachers on the first-base and third-base sides.

Variations
Distinctive from "goal games" such as football and basketball, which have fixed-size playing areas, the infield is the only rigidly laid-out part of the field. Like its English relative, cricket, there is significant flexibility in the shape and size of the rest of the playing area.

Baseball leagues may specify a minimum distance from home plate to the outfield fences. Generally, the higher the skill level, the deeper the minimum dimensions must be, to prevent an excess of home runs. (Rule 1.04, Note(a)).

However, with the opening of Baltimore's Camden Yards (1992), the "minimum distance" rule began to be ignored. One factor may be that the quaint, "retro" look of Camden Yards, with its irregular measurements, proved to be very popular, along with a traditionalist backlash against the symmetrical, multi-purpose, "cookie-cutter" stadiums. Since the opening of Camden Yards, many other "retro" stadiums have been built, each with asymmetrical fences. These distances vary from park to park, and can even change drastically in the same park. One of the most famous examples is the original Yankee Stadium, whose odd-shaped plot of land caused right field to be over  shorter than left, although this difference lessened over time.

Older ballparks, such as Fenway Park, were grandfathered in and allowed to keep their original dimensions. Also, new parks have sometimes received special dispensation to deviate from these rules. For instance, the second Yankee Stadium, built 2009, used the same dimensions as the original Yankee Stadium.

The heights of the fences can also vary greatly, the most famous example being the -high Green Monster in Fenway Park's left field. Such tall fences are often used to stop easy home runs in a section of the ballpark where the distances from home are shorter, or where there is little space between the field and the street beyond. The Hubert H. Humphrey Metrodome, when set up for baseball, had a  right field "fence" that was actually a relatively thin blue plastic sheet covering folded up football seats. It was often called a "baggie" or "Hefty bag".

Some ballparks have irregularly shaped fences. Ballparks may have round swooping fences or rigidly angled fences, or possibly a significant change in direction or irregular angle. For example, the center field stands and the left field stands at Fenway Park meet at an uneven angle, creating an indentation (called "the triangle") that angles sharply back into the stands. In Citi Field and Oracle Park, part of the right field fence juts unevenly into the outfield as if the builders were trying to create an unpredictable ricochet effect for balls hit against it. Some "retro" parks, such as Globe Life Park in Arlington, throw in a sudden and small inward turn (often referred to as a jog) just to give a little quirkiness to the design. Milwaukee's Miller Park was designed, with the help of former player Robin Yount, to promote extra base hits.

Originally (mostly in the old jewel box parks) these variations resulted from the shape of the property where the park was constructed. If there was a street beyond left field, the distance to the left field fence would be shorter, and if the distance was too short, the fence would be higher. For example, in the old Griffith Stadium in Washington, D.C., part of center field had to be built around a cluster of apartment houses and the result was a rather large angular indentation in the left-center field fence. Now, these variations are mostly influenced by the specifications and whims of the designers. New "retro" parks, which try to recapture the feel of the jewel box parks, are often designed to have these quirks.

Etymology

Baseball was originally played in open fields or public parks. The genesis of modern baseball is conventionally connected with Elysian Fields in Hoboken, New Jersey,  a large public park where the businessmen of New York City gathered from time to time to play organized baseball games and cricket matches, starting around the mid-1840s. The name "Field" or "Park" was typically attached to the names of the early ballparks.

With the beginnings of professional baseball, the ballfield became part of a complex including fixed spectator seating areas, and an enclosure to restrict access to paying customers, as with a fairgrounds. The name "Grounds" began to be attached to ballparks, starting with the Union Grounds in 1862.  The suffixes "Field" and "Park" were still used, but many professional ballparks were "Grounds". The last major league "Grounds" was the Polo Grounds in New York City, which was razed in 1964.

The term "stadium" has been used since ancient times, typically for a running track and its seating area. As college football gained in popularity, the smaller college playing fields and/or running tracks (which also frequently had the suffix "Field") gave way to large stadiums, many of them built during the sport's "boom" of the 1920s. Major league baseball enjoyed a similar boom. One of the first major league ballparks to be called a "stadium" was actually the Polo Grounds, which was temporarily renamed Brush Stadium from its reconstruction in 1911 until the death of owner John T. Brush in the 1920s. By then, the most famous baseball "stadium" of them all had been constructed: Yankee Stadium. From that point until the retro building boom of the 1990s, the suffix "Stadium" was used for almost every new major league venue, and was sometimes applied to the old ones, such as Shibe Park, which was renamed Connie Mack Stadium in 1954.

The suffix "Dome" was also used for the indoor stadiums constructed from the 1960s onward. The official names of those arenas also often included the word "Stadium", such as the Houston Astrodome, whose formal name was "Harris County Domed Stadium" in 1965; the Kingdome, whose formal name was "King County Domed Stadium", and the Metrodome, for which the Minneapolis highway signs directed the driver to "Metrodome Stadium". The retro era of the 1990s and early 2000s saw some venues return to using "park" in a stadium's name, even in domed structures such as T-Mobile Park and American Family Field.

There is little consistency in the choice between "Field" and "Park". For example, Houston's Minute Maid Park was originally named "Enron Field".

Settings
Seating area design of stadiums is affected by many variables, including required capacity, audience access, and road traffic. Early ballparks like Elysian Fields were far from the city center. Each game was an event, and fans traveled by public transit to watch the game.

With the growth of professional leagues, and consequent growth in the quantity of games, each game became less of an event, and fan convenience became more important.  Many professional ballparks were built either near the city center, or in working-class neighborhoods, based on the expected economic level of the average fan. Consequently, the classic ballparks typically had little space for automobiles, as it was expected that most fans would take mass transit to the games, a situation that still prevails at Boston's Fenway Park and Chicago's Wrigley Field, for example. Some early ballparks, such as Brooklyn's Eastern Park, were abandoned because the trolley lines did not go out far enough and the team was not performing well enough for people to tolerate the inconvenience.

As fans became more affluent, and especially as they moved to the suburbs and bought cars, the lack of parking became an important issue. Some ballparks remedied this problem through the construction of parking garages in the vicinity, or building new ballparks with ample parking. Others built ballparks in the suburbs, typically with large parking areas. The ballpark/stadium thus became an "island" in an "ocean" of parking space.

The modern "retro" trend seeks to cover all the bases: an urban location, with plenty of parking and public transportation available.

Types of baseball parks

Wooden ballparks

The first professional baseball venues were large wooden ballparks with seats mounted on wood platforms. Although known for being constructed out of wood, they featured iron columns for better support. Some included one tier of inclined seating,  topped with either a flat roof or, in some instances, a small upper tier. The outfield was bordered by tall walls or fences covered in advertisements, much like today's minor league parks. These advertisements were sometimes fronted with bleacher seats, or "bleaching boards". Wood, while prone to decomposition, was a relatively  inexpensive material. 

However, the use of wood as the primary material presented a major problem, especially as baseball continued to thrive. Over time, the wooden stands aged and dried. Many parks caught fire, and some were leveled completely. This problem, along with the popularization of baseball and expectations for long-term use of the parks were major factors that drove the transition to the new standard materials for ballparks: steel and concrete. Some famous wooden parks, such as the Polo Grounds III in New York and National League Park in Philadelphia, burned and were rebuilt with fire-resistant materials (Polo Grounds IV and Baker Bowl). Others were simply abandoned in favor of new structures built elsewhere. These new fire-resistant parks often lasted for many decades, and (retrospectively) came to be known as "jewel boxes". There are no more professional ballparks in existence left with this architectural trend, with the last one, Oriole Park V, burning down in 1944.

Jewel box ballparks

The earliest ballparks built or rebuilt of reinforced concrete, brick, and steel are now known as the jewel box ballparks or classic parks. Two-tiered grandstands became much more prevalent in this era, as well. The Baker Bowl in Philadelphia, which opened in 1895, was the first to use steel and brick as the primary construction materials and included a cantilevered upper deck seating area that hung out over the lower seating area. Although it did not use reinforced concrete in its construction, Baker Bowl is considered the first of the jewel box parks. The first of to use reinforced concrete was Shibe Park, which opened in 1909, also in Philadelphia.

The upper decks were typically held up by steel pillars that obstructed the view from some seats in the lower level. However, because of the supports used , the upper decks could come very close to the field. The two-tiered design was the standard for decades, until the New York Yankees built Yankee Stadium. To accommodate the large crowds Babe Ruth drew, Yankee Stadium was built with three tiers. This became the new standard until some recently built parks reverted to two, including PNC Park in 2001.

Most jewel box parks were built to fit the constraints of actual city blocks, often resulting in significantly asymmetrical outfield dimensions and large outfield walls to prevent easy home runs. Notable examples included League Park in Cleveland, which had a -tall wall in right field, and the Green Monster, the -tall left field wall at Fenway Park in Boston. Notable exceptions include Shibe Park and Comiskey Park, which were built on rectangular city blocks that were large enough to accommodate symmetrical left and right fields.

Other sports, such as soccer and football, were often played at these sites (Yankee Stadium, for example, was designed to accommodate football). In contrast to the later multi-purpose parks, the seats were generally angled in a configuration suitable for baseball. The "retro" ballparks built in the 1990s and beyond are an attempt to capture the feel of the jewel box parks. The only jewel box parks still used by Major League Baseball are Fenway Park and Wrigley Field.

MLB

NPB

Multi-purpose stadiums

From the 1960s until the arrival of retro parks in 1992, baseball built many multi-purpose ballparks. Also derisively known as "concrete donuts", "cookie-cutters", or "giant ashtrays", they were usually tall and circular or square structures made entirely of, usually bare, reinforced concrete. The parks were built to hold baseball as well as football, soccer, and other sports. One of the earliest baseball stadiums that incorporated this type of design was Cleveland Stadium (built 1932), which featured an oval grandstand that was more friendly to goal-centered sports like football. A park built to suit all sports well, which was co-owned by the teams or the city, seemed advantageous to all, especially because it was less expensive to maintain one stadium rather than two. Some parks that were originally built for one sport were renovated to accommodate multiple sports.

The shape of the parks generally depended on the original use. Baseball parks that were renovated to accommodate football, like Candlestick Park and Anaheim Stadium, were usually asymmetrically shaped. Football stadiums that were renovated to accommodate baseball, like Sun Life Stadium and Mile High Stadium, were usually of a rectangular shape, though Mile High actually started its life in 1948 as a Minor League Baseball park known as Bears Stadium. Parks that were built to serve both were usually circular and completely enclosed on all sides. These were the parks that gained multi-purpose parks the reputation as bland cookie-cutter structures. The first of these parks was DC Stadium (renamed RFK Stadium in 1969) in the District of Columbia. RFK is unique in that it hosted two different baseball teams, and that it was the first to originally be intended for multiple sports.

A notable variant among the cookie-cutter stadia was Shea Stadium. Its grandstand extended just beyond the foul poles and did not completely enclose the field. Plans were made to enclose the grandstand and build a dome, but engineers discovered that the structure could not handle the load of the proposed dome. Thus, the area behind the outfield fence remained open.

One major innovation of the multi-purpose parks was the cantilevered upper deck. In earlier ballparks, the columns used to support the upper decks obstructed the view from some seats in the lower deck. In the new design, the upper decks were extended upwards and the columns were removed. However, even though the extension counterbalanced some of the weight, the upper decks could no longer extend as close to the field and had to be moved back. Also, the roofs could no longer be as large, and often only covered the top 15 or so rows. This exposed fans to the elements.

Besides the drawbacks of the cantilever design, there were other issues with these parks. With few exceptions, seating was angled to face the center of the field of play, rather than home plate. Luxury boxes, which were a part of football culture, were now introduced to baseball, and were usually placed below the upper decks, pushing upper deck seating farther from the field. The capacities of these stadiums were larger than previous baseball stadiums. Typical game attendance did not fill the stadiums. Due to the rectangular shape needed for football or soccer, outfield dimensions were generally symmetrical, and even seats at field level down the lines could be far from the action.

Multi-purpose stadiums also posed issues for their non-baseball tenants. The "cookie-cutters" with swiveling, field-level sections proved problematic. Because the front rows were too close to the field, the fans had difficulty seeing over the football benches. This was evident in the movable seating sections in RFK Stadium. The first ten rows of the football configuration were practically at field level, and fans in those sections often stood up on their seats to get a better view. Other stadiums overcame this simply by covering those seats, not bothering to sell them. Despite being cost-effective, these problems eventually caused the parks to become unfashionable.

The multi-purpose architecture reached a climax when Toronto's SkyDome (now Rogers Centre) opened in 1989. It had state-of-the-art amenities including a retractable roof, hotel, and a restaurant behind the outfield from where patrons could view the games.

Only one of the purely open-air multi-purpose parks is still in use today: Oakland Coliseum. The Athletics plan to move out of Oakland Coliseum and build a new ballpark of their own in the future, and their former co-tenants, the NFL Oakland Raiders, moved to Las Vegas in 2020.

Note: To reduce redundancy, this table does not list the indoor stadiums of the multi-purpose era in this section.

*A baseball-only ballpark converted to a multi-purpose stadium.

**A football-only stadium converted to a multi-purpose stadium.

 denotes stadium is also a retractable-roof ballpark

Modern ballparks

While most teams turned to multi-purpose parks, some built baseball-only parks. While these modern ballparks shirked some of the conventions of multi-purpose parks, they did include some of the new features. The most notable influences were the cantilevered upper decks, the use of seating colors other than green, fairly plain concrete exteriors, and symmetrical outfields. While the multi-purpose parks have become all but extinct, some modern parks, such as Dodger Stadium and Kauffman Stadium, have been hailed for aging beautifully. Rather than build new parks, the teams have decided instead to renovate the current structures, adding a few newer conveniences. Several of the modern parks built as such have remained in use, with no indication of being demolished.

While Cleveland Stadium is the ancestor to the multi-purpose ballpark, the ancestor of the modern ballpark is Milwaukee County Stadium. It was the first to feature a symmetrical, round outfield fence. It also featured the rounded V-shaped grandstand and colorful seats that are common among modern parks. Coincidentally, it also would have been one of the earlier examples of a converted park as well. It was supposed to replace a minor league facility, and serve as home of the minor league team until a major league franchise could be lured to the city. However, the Braves came to Milwaukee earlier than expected, and the minor league team never played in the stadium.

The first two truly modern ballparks were built by the two New York teams who moved to California, the Giants and the Dodgers. Candlestick Park was created first, but was converted to a multi-purpose park to accommodate the 49ers. Dodger Stadium has been upgraded a number of times, but remains baseball-only and its original design is still largely intact.

Anaheim Stadium, which was initially modeled closely on Dodger Stadium, was expanded for football, but once the Rams departed, most of the extra outfield seating was peeled back, returning the structure to something closer to its original design.

The original Yankee Stadium is an exceptional case. Yankee Stadium was a jewel box park, albeit a very large one. It was showing its age in the 1970s, and the stadium was extensively renovated during 1973–1975, converting it into more of a modern style ballpark. Many of the characteristics that defined it as a classical jewel box were also retained, so the remodeled Stadium straddled both categories.

New Comiskey Park (now Guaranteed Rate Field) was the last modern ballpark to be built in North America. A series of renovations have been made to make it appear more like a retro-classic ballpark.

Although they were purposefully built for baseball, some of these stadiums also hosted professional soccer and football teams at times. The Minnesota Vikings played at Metropolitan Stadium during the Twins' entire tenure there,  and the Green Bay Packers played a few home games at Milwaukee County Stadium every year from 1953 through 1994. A few of them, including Metropolitan Stadium, also hosted NASL teams during the 1970s.

The only modern parks still used by Major League Baseball are Dodger Stadium, Angel Stadium, Kauffman Stadium, and Guaranteed Rate Field, although the latter has been renovated into a Retro-classic ballpark while Angel Stadium and Kauffman Stadium have been renovated into Retro-modern ballparks.

Temporary and converted ballparks

The expansion teams of the 1960s led to the emergence of two distinct subsets of parks in the major leagues: temporary ballparks and converted ballparks.

Temporary ballparks were used when a new ballpark was planned for an expansion team or moving franchise, but was not completed. This occurred for a few reasons, such as delays or a desire to hold off until the deal is settled. In this case, an established building is used as a temporary home, often a minor league park. The first temporary ballparks were not actually used by expansion teams but by established franchises. When the Dodgers and Giants moved to California from New York, they played in Los Angeles Memorial Coliseum and Seals Stadium respectively while Dodger Stadium and Candlestick Park were being built.

Converted ballparks were an alternative to building an entirely new stadium. These parks were pre-existing minor league or college facility that were expanded to fit a major league team. Converted ballparks are distinct from football stadia that were converted to multi-purpose parks in that converted ballparks were originally built for baseball only, albeit for a non-major league level. Early converted ballparks were Memorial Stadium in Baltimore, Municipal Stadium in Kansas City, and Metropolitan Stadium in Bloomington, Minnesota. All three were expanded minor league facilities, although Baltimore and the Met were constructed with the idea of expanding to major league level in mind. Kansas City was a true established minor league park that was substantially expanded to accommodate major league size crowds.

These two types of ballpark are distinct because of their use, not their design. Because of this, a temporary or converted ballpark can also be any of the other types: jewel box, modern, multi-purpose, etc.

MLB

NPB

Indoor ballparks

An important type of ballpark is the indoor park. These parks were covered with a fixed roof, usually a hard concrete dome. Reasons to build indoor parks were varied. The Astrodome, the first indoor sports stadium ever built, was built to escape the hot and very humid climate of Houston and the Kingdome was built to escape Seattle's constant fall and winter rains. In Japan, domed stadiums were built to escape frequently rainy climates, as well as extreme snowfall in Sapporo. There is little to no natural light in these parks, necessitating the use of one of the most distinguishing aspects of an indoor park: artificial turf. While roofing technology now allows grass to be grown in indoor venues (see Forsyth Barr Stadium, a rugby venue in New Zealand with an ETFE roof), the first generation of indoor parks predated such roofs. Since there was not enough light to grow grass, artificial turf was installed, and this affected the game. Artificial turf was harder, and thus a ball hit on the ground moved faster and bounced high. This, coupled with the usually dull white or gray roofs that could camouflage a fly ball, caused what Twins fans called a "dome-field advantage".

A park of note is Olympic Stadium in Montreal. The park was designed with a large tower that loomed over top. Cables came down from the top of the tower to connect to the large oval center of the roof. This oval center was supposed to be lifted by the cables, opening the park up if the weather was pleasant. However, the mechanism never worked correctly, and what was supposed to be a retractable roof was initially not used, then used for only a short period of time, and later replaced with a permanently fixed roof, making the stadium a strictly indoor facility.

Another notable park was the Hubert H. Humphrey Metrodome in Minneapolis, which instead of a rigid masonry roof was covered by inflatable fiberglass sheeting, held up by air pressure. A drawback to this design, at least in Minnesota's severe winter climate, was revealed when the dome collapsed three times in its first three years of operation due to accumulated snow. The Tokyo Dome has a similar roof; due to Tokyo's considerably milder winter climate, that stadium has not had the Metrodome's snow-related issues.

Indoor parks faced many of the same problems of the multi-purpose parks. Tropicana Field is the only indoor-only or fixed-dome park left hosting a Major League Baseball team, and may be replaced in the near future. Japan still has several fixed-dome parks designed primarily for baseball. One of these, the Sapporo Dome, has an uncommon feature of two separate playing surfaces. Baseball is played on a permanently installed artificial surface within the dome, while a permanent grass pitch is attached to the structure and mechanically slid into the dome for use in soccer matches.

MLB

NPB

Retractable-roof ballparks

The indoor parks were built for several different reasons, chief among those weather. However, as multi-purpose parks became unfashionable, so did indoor parks. This led to the creation of retractable-roof parks. These allowed shelter from the elements, but still could be open when the weather was pleasant. To be able to support the roof, most were closed in on all sides like multi-purpose and indoor parks.

Because the roof needs to go somewhere when not covering the field, a distinguishing characteristic of the retractable roof park is a large extension of the interior spaces to either one side of the field or both sides that the roof sits on when retracted. The only exception to this is American Family Field, whose fan-shaped roof folds in upon itself and hangs behind the stands down the foul lines. Often, when retracted, the roof still hangs over the field, casting large shadows. This is countered at American Family Field by large panes of glass under the roof. While most stadiums seal up when the roof is closed, others remain partially open, such as T-Mobile Park, whose roof acts as an "umbrella" to shield from Seattle's frequently rainy weather.

Pittsburgh's Civic Arena was the first sports building in the world with a retractable roof; however, the building was originally constructed for the Pittsburgh Civic Light Opera, which moved out in 1969 due to dissatisfaction with the acoustics in the arena. The arena's long-term tenants, the NHL's Pittsburgh Penguins, never played with the roof open, and the arena itself was never used for baseball (and was too small to be used for that sport). While Montreal's Olympic Stadium was the first baseball park to have a retractable roof, the roof was plagued by numerous problems, and was never fully used. This made Rogers Centre the first fully functional retractable-roof park. It managed to succeed where Olympic Stadium failed, building a multi-section roof that folded upon itself, retracting over the hotel in center field.

Retractable-roof parks can vary greatly in style, from the utilitarian (Rogers Centre), to those infused with retro elements (such as Minute Maid Park), to the contemporary (loanDepot Park). The style of each park reflects the popular architecture of the era in which it was built. (This differs from indoor ballparks, all of which were built during the time of multi-purpose parks, and thus reflected the same "flying-saucer" style.)  When Rogers Centre opened in 1989, baseball was near the end of the modern and multi-purpose era. Chase Field, T-Mobile Park, Minute Maid Park, and American Family Field all opened in the middle of the retro era. When loanDepot Park opened in 2012 as Marlins Park, it introduced a new and different style, and perhaps the beginning of a new era. The Texas Rangers built Globe Life Field in the retro style similar to their previous ballpark, Globe Life Park.

Therefore, the term "retractable-roof ballpark/stadium" is not a description of the overall architectural style of the building, but of the functional aspect of it. For this reason, retractable-roof parks are also dual-listed in style-based types of ballparks. For example, the four retractable-roof parks built in the United States during the retro era are also considered to be retro-modern ballparks.

MLB

NPB

Retro-classic ballparks

HOK Sport, now known as Populous, designed Sahlen Field in Buffalo to attract a major league franchise to the city. The stadium opened in 1988 as home of the Buffalo Bisons, but was passed over in the 1993 Major League Baseball expansion (Sahlen Field was eventually used as a temporary MLB facility by the Toronto Blue Jays in the 2020 season and 2021 season due to Canada's travel restrictions following the outbreak of COVID-19). HOK Sport would take what they learned in Buffalo about styling a retro-classic ballpark, or retro ballpark, to their major league project in Baltimore.

In 1992, Oriole Park at Camden Yards opened in Baltimore. Going in a different direction from the multi-purpose and modern ballparks, Camden Yards harkened back to the old jewel box parks. This began the trend of building retro-classic ballparks in Major League Baseball.

The retro parks were built with all the luxuries of the newer parks, such as luxury boxes and more restrooms and concession areas, along with new additions, such as indoor concourses that are open to the field, allowing fans to always have a view of the game. However (except for a few exceptions harkening back to the wooden ballpark era), the aesthetics shifted back to jewel box conventions, which included the use of green seats, bricks, stone, and green-painted exposed steel.

A major divergence from jewel boxes was the layout of the grandstand. The focus was now on everyone in the park having a good view. Columns were missing as with the modern parks, but the upper deck was drawn back and shrunk, while the middle tiers grew in size, causing a stepped effect. The cantilevered upper deck was no longer a large necessity. However, since these new upper decks were drawn back, the shape of the inclined seating was clearly expressed on the exterior, a feature that is a hallmark of modern parks.

Like the jewel box parks, the outfield fences were angled rather than the gradual curve of the newer parks, and often had quirky dimensions. The requirements for minimum distance to the outfield fences were frequently waived during this time.

Teams with multi-purpose and indoor parks longed for this beautiful and classic look, and began systematically demolishing them and moving to either retro-classic or retro-modern parks. Since Camden Yards opened, two-thirds of all major league teams have opened new ballparks, each of which contain unique features. The most important feature was that they were built primarily for baseball, although these venues have also hosted football, soccer and ice hockey games. Turner Field was originally constructed as Centennial Olympic Stadium for the 1996 Summer Olympics and was retrofitted to baseball the following year.

Guaranteed Rate Field has an unusual place in ballpark history. It was the last modern park built, a year before Camden Yards and hence just missing the retro movement. It was viewed as obsolete only a year into its life. The White Sox responded with a series of renovations to give the park more retro charm. This included the changing from a cantilever upper deck to a flat roof with columns, the change from a symmetrical fence to a more recognizably-shaped asymmetrical fence, and the adoption of a primarily dark-green color scheme, reminiscent of the original Comiskey Park. Upper deck seating was also reduced to eliminate locations which had proven unpopular with fans, and often went conspicuously unsold.

The most recent retro-classic ballparks were built in New York City. Queens' Citi Field is modeled after Ebbets Field, and the Bronx's Yankee Stadium is modeled after the pre-renovation "House that Ruth Built". Both parks opened in 2009.

Teams are now trending away from the retro-classic look and are instead building retro-modern and contemporary ballparks. Turner Field was the first retro-classic park replaced, as the Atlanta Braves moved to Truist Park after the 2016 season, while the Texas Rangers moved from Globe Life Park in Arlington to the retractable-roof Globe Life Field in 2020.

Retro-modern ballparks

While Camden Yards influenced nearly every ballpark built after it, not all fully adhere to its design. Those that deviate to incorporate more modern-looking elements are called retro-modern ballparks.

Progressive Field, originally Jacobs Field, was built two years after Camden Yards, and featured the angular, asymmetrical fences of varying heights, a smaller upper deck, stepped tiers, and an unobtrusive singular color scheme. While the interior has all the hallmarks of a retro park, the exterior did not feature the look of the jewel box parks. It could not truly be called a retro-classic park.

Many of today's parks have followed in this second school of retro. Rather than brick, the exteriors heavily feature white- or gray-painted steel. If there is any masonry, it is sandstone or limestone. Some feature progressive elements such as curtain walls, or retractable roofs.

Angel Stadium of Anaheim has seen many changes throughout the years. It was originally a modern park, similar to the Angels' previous home, Dodger Stadium. When the NFL's Los Angeles Rams left the Los Angeles Memorial Coliseum in 1980 and set up shop in what was then Anaheim Stadium, the first round of renovations began. The grandstand was expanded to completely enclose the stadium, turning it into a multi-purpose park. The Rams left in 1994, leaving the Angels alone in the large, 65,000-seat stadium. After a two-year renovation, the steel was painted green, and what concrete remained was painted sandstone, including the sweeping curve of the entrance plaza. The seating configuration was significantly altered, most notably by tearing out most of the outfield seating except for parts of the lower decks in left and right fields, to more closely resemble the original design from the park's first 15 years. The finished product in 1998 was a retro-modern ballpark.

In the same year, Chase Field opened as Bank One Ballpark for the expansion Arizona Diamondbacks, it incorporated a retractable roof and a swimming pool—elements that did not exist in jewel-box ballparks. Despite the absence of MLB history in the Phoenix area and an overwhelming roof design, much of the interior was still built with all of the hallmarks of retro, similar to Progressive Field. Although Chase Field was not the first retractable-roof ballpark in history, it was the first in a wave of four retractable-roof ballparks (opening within just four years) to follow the retro-modern pattern.

During the second decade of retro, Petco Park and Kauffman Stadium followed the construction and renovation concepts of Progressive Field and Angel Stadium, respectively. Meanwhile, the period saw another subset of three new retro-modern stadiums that pushed away from classic parks even more.

When Great American Ball Park opened in 2003, it featured a contemporary-looking, glass-wrapped facade. Such prominent use of elements that were unfamiliar even to pre-1992 modern stadiums signaled that some stadium planners were more willing to incorporate designs that looked into the 21st century as much as they did the 20th. Five years later, Nationals Park built off Cincinnati's design, making yet more liberal use of glass along with white concrete that would not clash with architecture in the District. Nationals Park became the first stadium to go green while still offering all of the amenities—another concept that looked ahead instead of behind. The retro-modern style climaxed in 2010 with the sculptured, contemporary exterior and canopy of Target Field, rendering it almost unrecognizable from the outside. Its cantilevered glass on top of a limestone base was designed partly to functionally fit the tiny 8-acre plot in the middle of a bustling transportation interchange. But the principal architect of Target Field, Earl Santee of Populous, said that the exterior was also an artistic interpretation of the culture of Minnesotans: a dichotomy of cosmopolitan and natural. Designing the building as a metaphor for people was a different way of thinking about ballpark architecture.

The exterior of the later retro-contemporary trio of ballparks progressively evolved further and further from jewel-box or even modern-style parks. Yet, in the stands and on the field they still have the familiar classic feel while implementing the marks of retro (i.e., unique-shaped fences, forest green or other singular color scheme, etc.).

 denotes stadium is also a retractable-roof ballpark

Contemporary ballparks

Prior to the start of the 2012 baseball season, USA Today noted that new Marlins Park would "perhaps provide a coda to the postmodern Camden Yards era". After two decades of the retro style dominating ballpark architecture, a new type of design emerged in 2012 with the opening of the venue now known as LoanDepot Park, snapping the consecutive streak of 20 new (plus 3 renovated) MLB retro stadiums. This latest style's purpose is to make the fan experience the present-day culture of the stadium's surrounding city or area, and rejects the basic notion of retro. Stadium planners are calling the style contemporary.

A contemporary stadium for Tampa Bay was designed, but the project was cancelled. The New Yorker wrote regarding the new MLB architecture: "The retro mold has finally been broken, but this might be the last chance a new style gets for some time."

A park in a similar style built for the Hokkaido Nippon-Ham Fighters of Nippon Professional Baseball opened in 2023.

 denotes stadium is also a retractable-roof ballpark

Current Major League ballparks

The numbers indicate the number of feet from home plate to the wall of that part of the field. Left and Right Field normally refer to the distances along the foul lines. Left Center and Right Center are the approximate power alley figures. Center Field could mean straightaway center field or it could mean to the deepest part of the center field area. Backstop refers to the distance behind home plate to the backstop screen. Capacity figures may also vary.

In 1958 MLB instituted a rule mandating that parks built thereafter have minimum outfield distances of 325' down the lines and 400' to center; older parks were grandfathered. Since 1991, however, numerous waivers have been granted, as can be seen from the table.

* Fenway Park is 37,227 during day games

** Oakland Coliseum is expandable to 55,945.

*** Tropicana Field is expandable to 42,735.
        

See also

List of baseball parks by capacity
List of Major League Baseball stadiums
List of U.S. baseball stadiums by capacity
List of terraces at baseball venues
All-you-can-eat seats
Scoreboard

Footnotes

References

External links 

 How Baseball Parks Have Changed Through Time
 Baseball Park facts, figures, photos, and more at Ballparks.com
 A map of Baseball Stadiums in US and Canada
 Ballpark dimensions for all MLB parks past and present

 
Sports venues by type
Sports venues